Edward Grogan may refer to:
 Sir Edward Grogan, 1st Baronet (1802–1891), MP for Dublin City, 1841–1865
 Sir Edward Grogan, 2nd Baronet (1873–1927),  British Army officer

See also
Grogan baronets
Grogan (surname)